The Magician is a Latin disco album credited to Timmy Thomas and released in 1976. Mike Lewis was responsible for the horn and string arrangements.

Track listing
"The Magician" 		
"Say Love, Can You Chase Away My Blues?" 		
"Stone to the Bone" 		
"Show Me Tenderness" 		
"Watch It! Watch It! Watch It! For Dudley Dudley Dorite" 		
"Make Peace With Yourself" 		
"Let My People Go" 		
"Don't Put It Down" 		
"Running Out of Time"

References 

1976 albums
Timmy Thomas albums
TK Records albums